Aphomia pimelodes is a species of snout moth in the genus Aphomia. It was described by Edward Meyrick in 1936. It is found in Zimbabwe.

References

Endemic fauna of Zimbabwe
Moths described in 1936
Tirathabini
Lepidoptera of Zimbabwe
Moths of Sub-Saharan Africa